Marjorie Vilchez Soto  (born ) was a Peruvian female volleyball player.

She was part of the Peru women's national volleyball team at the 1996 Summer Olympics, and the 1994 FIVB Volleyball Women's World Championship. On club level she played with Latino Amisa.

Clubs
 Latino Amisa (1994)

References

External links
http://www.todor66.com/volleyball/South_America/Girls_1994.html
http://www.peruvoley.com/foro/viewtopic.php?t=2036
https://www.youtube.com/watch?v=rnAyalQier8

1978 births
Living people
Peruvian women's volleyball players
Place of birth missing (living people)
Volleyball players at the 1996 Summer Olympics
Olympic volleyball players of Peru
20th-century Peruvian women